The badminton competitions at the 2019 Southeast Asian Games in Manila were held at Muntinlupa Sports Complex in Muntinlupa, Metro Manila. The 2019 Games featured competitions in seven tournaments (3 men tournaments, 3 women tournaments, and 1 mixed tournament).

Participating nations
A total of 117 athletes from 8 nations participated (the numbers of athletes are shown in parentheses).

Competition schedule
The following is the schedule for the badminton competitions: All times are on Philippine Standard Time (UTC+8):

Medal summary

Medal table

Medalists

References

External links
 

 
Badminton tournaments in the Philippines